Inga coragypsea is a species of plant in the family Fabaceae. It is found only in Colombia.

References

coragypsea
Vulnerable plants
Endemic flora of Colombia
Taxonomy articles created by Polbot